Beatrice C. "Bee" Palmer (11 September 1894 – 22 December 1967) was an American singer and dancer born in Chicago, Illinois.

Palmer first attracted significant attention as one of the first exponents of the "shimmy" dance in the late 1910s. She was sometimes credited as the creator of the "shimmy" (although there were other claimants at the time as well).

She first appeared in the Ziegfeld Follies in 1918.

She toured with an early jazz band, which included such notables as Emmett Hardy, Leon Ropollo and Santo Pecora in addition to pianist/songwriter Al Siegel (whom Palmer married). The band was called "Bee Palmer's New Orleans Rhythm Kings". With some personnel changes, the Rhythm Kings went on to even greater fame after parting ways with Palmer.

In 1921, an alleged affair with boxing champ Jack Dempsey created a scandal and a lawsuit.

Palmer is credited as co-composer of the pop song standard "Please Don't Talk About Me When I'm Gone".

She made a few recordings which were not issued at the time.  One was a session with Frankie Trumbauer that featured Palmer performing vocalese on the Bix Beiderbecke and Trumbauer solos on Singin' the Blues to  lyrics by Ted Koehler. Thanks to surviving test pressings/masters, the recordings were finally issued in the 1990s and 2000s.

References

External links

 Bee Palmer 1894-1967 at the Red Hot Jazz Archive
 Bee Palmer at  Jazzage 1920s site

1894 births
1967 deaths
American female dancers
Dancers from Illinois
American women jazz singers
American jazz singers
Singers from Chicago
20th-century American singers
Jazz musicians from Illinois
20th-century American women singers
20th-century American dancers
New Orleans Rhythm Kings members